Cornard Wood, near Sudbury, Suffolk is a 1748 landscape painting by Thomas Gainsborough, now in the National Gallery, London, which bought it in 1875. The title has been used since 1828 and derives from a 1790 print of a Gainsborough work, though it is unproven whether the church tower in the background can be identified with that at Great Cornard, Suffolk.

References

Landscape paintings by Thomas Gainsborough
1748 paintings
Collections of the National Gallery, London